Power Rangers S.P.D. is a side-scrolling beat-em-up video game developed by Natsume and published by THQ for the Game Boy Advance on September 6, 2005. It was the sixth Power Rangers video game to be published by THQ,

Gameplay
Six different rangers are playable, each with their own unique abilities. The Red Ranger, has the power to walk through enemies and obstacles, Blue Ranger, creates a force field to block attacks and stop enemies from approaching, Green Ranger, tracks energy signatures to find missing objects, Yellow Ranger, creates three duplicates of herself to triple her attack power, Pink Ranger, turns her hand into iron to punch through walls or eliminate a minor enemy with one hit and finally Shadow Ranger, creates an energy blade that harms several enemies at once. 

The 6 rangers fight minor enemies until they encounter the main boss. There are racing levels which involve piloting the Red, Yellow, or Pink Delta Runners, a targeting game (similar to Space Invaders) with the Green Delta Runner, a racing level involving R.I.C. (the Rangers' robotic dog), and Megazord battle levels.

Reception

Power Rangers S.P.D. has a 55 percent rating on GameRankings, based on two reviews.

Anise Hollingshead of GameZone gave the game 7 out of 10, and praised the graphics, but criticized its "boring" backgrounds. Hollingshead wrote, "The controls are probably the best part of the game, and is where the design team shined. There is no collision detection to worry about in the main levels, and the jumping is superbly handled. This is the way wall-jumping should be in every game." Mark Bozon of IGN gave the game 4 out of 10, and criticized the basic gameplay but wrote, "While it is very difficult to capture the cinematic nature of the television show into the cramped space of a Game Boy cart, this is one area where Power Rangers SPD showed strength over previous Power Ranger titles."

References

2005 video games
Game Boy Advance games
Game Boy Advance-only games
THQ games
Natsume (company) games
Power Rangers video games
Power Rangers S.P.D.
Video games about police officers
Video games developed in Japan
Video games featuring female protagonists
Superhero video games
Single-player video games